Vice Admiral Robert Risley Squires DL (11 February 1927 – 30 June 2016) was a Royal Navy officer who became Flag Officer, Scotland and Northern Ireland.

Naval career
Squires joined the Royal Navy as a sub-lieutenant in 1946. He was given command of the frigate HMS Hermione in 1971 and of the destroyer HMS Bristol in 1975. He went on to be Commanding Officer of the frigate HMS Ajax as well as Captain of the 8th Frigate Squadron in 1976, Flag Officer First Flotilla in 1977 and Flag Officer Submarines in 1978. After that he became Flag Officer, Scotland and Northern Ireland in 1982 before retiring in 1983.

He lived at Seaview, Isle of Wight, and became Deputy Lieutenant of the Isle of Wight. He died on 30 June 2016 at the age of 89.

Family
He was married to Sue.

References

|-

1927 births
2016 deaths
Royal Navy vice admirals
Deputy Lieutenants of the Isle of Wight